Musée de la Folie Marco is a museum in Barr in the Bas-Rhin department of France.

See also
List of museums in France

References

Folie
Museums in Bas-Rhin